Susquenita High School is a small, rural, public high school located in Duncannon, Perry County, Pennsylvania. It is the sole high school operated by the Susquenita School District. Susquenita High School serves the boroughs of Marysville, New Buffalo, and Duncannon. It also serves: Watts Township, Wheatfield Township, Penn Township, and Rye Township, as well as Reed Township in Dauphin County.

Extracurriculars
Susquenita High School offers a variety of clubs, activities and an extensive sports program.
Arts
The drama department was nominated for two Hershey Apollo awards (best pit band and best play) and won the award for 2011 best pit band. In 2016, a senior was awarded outstanding lead actress for her portrayal of Ebenezer Scrooge.

Since 2008, the West Side Singers, Susquenita's auditioned choir has received a top rating of Superior at its annual adjudication trip. While competing in Boston at Festivals of Music, not only did all choirs receive a Superior rating but the Women's Choir won the Best Overall Choir Award.  This group has been chosen to perform at the PA Music Educators Conference in Hershey, PA in 2015.

Sports
The district funds:

Boys
Baseball - AAA
Basketball- AAAA
Cross country - AA
Football (w/Carson Long Military Academy) - AAA
Soccer - AA
Tennis - AA
Track and field - AA
Wrestling  - AA

Girls
Basketball - AAA
Cross country - A
Field hockey - A
Soccer - AA
Softball - AAA
Track and field - AA

According to PIAA directory June 2017

References

Education in Dauphin County, Pennsylvania
Education in Perry County, Pennsylvania
Susquehanna Valley
Education in Harrisburg, Pennsylvania
Public high schools in Pennsylvania
1953 establishments in Pennsylvania
Educational institutions established in 1953